Superbike Challenge is a 1987 video game published by Broderbund and developed by MC2-Microids.

Gameplay
Superbike Challenge is a game in which 12 courses (including Bugatti, Misano, Salzburgring, and Silverstone) are featured, with three difficulty levels.

Reception
David M. Wilson and Johnny L. Wilson reviewed the game for Computer Gaming World, and stated that "If you would rather race over authentic courses, Broderbund's Superbike Challenge [...] features 12 authentic courses".

References

External links
Review in Antic
Review in The Australian Commodore and Amiga Review
Review in PC Resource's PC Games

1987 video games
Atari ST games
Commodore 64 games
DOS games
Broderbund games
Microïds games
Motorcycle video games
Racing video games
Video games developed in France
Video games set in Europe